Dean Michael Evans (born 14 April 1967) is a former field hockey player from Australia, who was a member of the team that won the silver medal at the 1992 Summer Olympics in Barcelona, Spain.  Dean was also a member of the Australian Men's field hockey team in 1986 when they won gold at the World Cup for the first time.

References

External links
 

1967 births
Living people
Australian male field hockey players
Olympic field hockey players of Australia
Olympic silver medalists for Australia
Olympic medalists in field hockey
Field hockey players at the 1992 Summer Olympics
Medalists at the 1992 Summer Olympics
1990 Men's Hockey World Cup players
20th-century Australian people